Kita-Jūsan-Jō-Higashi Station (北13条東駅) is a Sapporo Municipal Subway in Higashi-ku, Sapporo, Hokkaido, Japan. The station number is H06.

Platforms

Surrounding area
 Kita-Jūni-Jō Station, Namboku Line
 Kita Ward Tetsunishi Community Development Center
 Japan National Route 5
 Sapporo Higashi Health Center
 Kita-Higashi Central Police Station
 Sapporo Kita 12-Jo Post Office
 Tenshi College
 Tenshi Hospital

External links
 Sapporo Subway Stations

Railway stations in Japan opened in 1988
Railway stations in Sapporo
Sapporo Municipal Subway
Higashi-ku, Sapporo